Alexander Feilding, 12th Earl of Denbigh, 11th Earl of Desmond (born 4 November 1970), styled Viscount Feilding until 1995, is an English and Irish peer and landowner.

He was a member of the House of Lords from 1995 to 1999.

Life 
Denbigh is the son of Rollo Feilding, 11th Earl of Denbigh and his wife Judy Cooke.

He lives at and manages the family estate, Newnham Paddox House, at Monks Kirby near Rugby in Warwickshire. In 2014, the family put part of the estate lands up for sale to help cover death duties.

He is Patron of Offchurch Bury Polo Club in Warwickshire.

Marriage and children
Denbigh married Suzanne Jane Allen on 27 January 1996. They have three children:
 Peregrine Rudolph Henry Feilding, Viscount Feilding (born 19 February 2005), heir apparent
 Lady Hester Imelda Florence Feilding (born 5 July 2006) 
 The Hon. Orlando Gregory Danger Feilding (born 12 January 2009)

References

External links

Living people
1970 births
Conservative Party (UK) hereditary peers
Alexander
Earls of Denbigh
Desmond, Alexander Feilding, 11th Earl of
Denbigh